{{DISPLAYTITLE:5 21 honeycomb}}

In geometry, the 521 honeycomb is a uniform tessellation of 8-dimensional Euclidean space. The symbol 521 is from Coxeter, named for the length of the 3 branches of its Coxeter-Dynkin diagram.

By putting spheres at its vertices one obtains the densest-possible packing of spheres in 8 dimensions. This was proven by Maryna Viazovska in 2016 using the theory of modular forms. Viazovska was awarded the Fields Medal for this work in 2022.

This honeycomb was first studied by Gosset who called it a 9-ic semi-regular figure (Gosset regarded honeycombs in n dimensions as degenerate n+1 polytopes).

Each vertex of the 521 honeycomb is surrounded by 2160 8-orthoplexes and 17280 8-simplicies.

The vertex figure of Gosset's honeycomb is the semiregular 421 polytope. It is the final figure in the k21 family.

This honeycomb is highly regular in the sense that its symmetry group (the affine  Weyl group) acts transitively on the k-faces for k ≤ 6. All of the k-faces for k ≤ 7 are simplices.

Construction

It is created by a Wythoff construction upon a set of 9 hyperplane mirrors in 8-dimensional space.

The facet information can be extracted from its Coxeter-Dynkin diagram.
 

Removing the node on the end of the 2-length branch leaves the 8-orthoplex, 611.
 

Removing the node on the end of the 1-length branch leaves the 8-simplex.
 

The vertex figure is determined by removing the ringed node and ringing the neighboring node. This makes the 421 polytope.
 

The edge figure is determined from the vertex figure by removing the ringed node and ringing the neighboring node. This makes the 321 polytope.
 

The face figure is determined from the edge figure by removing the ringed node and ringing the neighboring node. This makes the 221 polytope.
 

The cell figure is determined from the face figure by removing the ringed node and ringing the neighboring node. This makes the 121 polytope.

Kissing number 

Each vertex of this tessellation is the center of a 7-sphere in the densest packing in 8 dimensions; its kissing number is 240, represented by the vertices of its vertex figure 421.

E8 lattice 
 contains  as a subgroup of index 5760.

 contains  as a subgroup of index 270.

The vertex arrangement of 521 is called the E8 lattice.

The E8 lattice can also be constructed as a union of the vertices of two 8-demicube honeycombs (called a D82 or D8+ lattice), as well as the union of the vertices of three 8-simplex honeycombs (called an A83 lattice):
 =  ∪  =  ∪  ∪

Regular complex honeycomb 
Using a complex number coordinate system, it can also be constructed as a  regular complex polytope, given the symbol 3{3}3{3}3{3}3{3}3, and Coxeter diagram . Its elements are in relative proportion as 1 vertex, 80 3-edges, 270 3{3}3 faces, 80 3{3}3{3}3 cells and 1 3{3}3{3}3{3}3 Witting polytope cells.

Related polytopes and honeycombs 

The 521 is seventh in a dimensional series of semiregular polytopes, identified in 1900 by Thorold Gosset.  Each member of the sequence has the previous member as its vertex figure.  All facets of these polytopes are regular polytopes, namely simplexes and orthoplexes.

See also 
 E8 lattice
 152 honeycomb
 251 honeycomb

Notes

References
 Coxeter The Beauty of Geometry: Twelve Essays, Dover Publications, 1999,  (Chapter 3: Wythoff's Construction for Uniform Polytopes)
 
 Kaleidoscopes: Selected Writings of H.S.M. Coxeter, edited by F. Arthur Sherk, Peter McMullen, Anthony C. Thompson, Asia Ivic Weiss, Wiley-Interscience Publication, 1995,  
 (Paper 24) H.S.M. Coxeter, Regular and Semi-Regular Polytopes III, [Math. Zeit. 200 (1988) 3-45]
 N.W. Johnson: Geometries and Transformations, (2015)

9-polytopes